Souris was a provincial electoral district for the Legislative Assembly of the province of Saskatchewan, Canada. This district was one of 25 created for the 1st Saskatchewan general election in 1905. The constituency was dissolved and combined with the Estevan district (as Souris-Estevan) before the 8th Saskatchewan general election in 1934.

It is now part of the provincial constituencies of Estevan and Cannington.

Members of the Legislative Assembly

Election results

|-
 
| style="width: 130px"|Provincial Rights
|James Thomas Brown
|align="right"|1,788
|align="right"|55.10%
|align="right"|–

|- bgcolor="white"
!align="left" colspan=3|Total
!align="right"|3,245
!align="right"|100.00%
!align="right"|

|-
 
| style="width: 130px"|Provincial Rights
|Archibald W. Riddell
|align="right"|1,132
|align="right"|60.76%
|align="right"|+5.66

|- bgcolor="white"
!align="left" colspan=3|Total
!align="right"|1,863
!align="right"|100.00%
!align="right"|

|-

 
|Conservative
|J.J. Heaslip
|align="right"|722
|align="right"|48.85%
|align="right"|-11.91
|- bgcolor="white"
!align="left" colspan=3|Total
!align="right"|1,478
!align="right"|100.00%
!align="right"|

|-
 
| style="width: 130px"|Conservative
|William Oliver Fraser
|align="right"|1,905
|align="right"|56.55%
|align="right"|+7.70

|- bgcolor="white"
!align="left" colspan=3|Total
!align="right"|3,369
!align="right"|100.00%
!align="right"|

|-
 
| style="width: 130px"|Conservative
|John Patrick Gordon
|align="right"|1,260
|align="right"|50.58%
|align="right"|-5.97

|- bgcolor="white"
!align="left" colspan=3|Total
!align="right"|2,491
!align="right"|100.00%
!align="right"|

|-

 
|Conservative
|John Patrick Gordon
|align="right"|1,308
|align="right"|48.14%
|align="right"|-2.44
|- bgcolor="white"
!align="left" colspan=3|Total
!align="right"|2,717
!align="right"|100.00%
!align="right"|

|-
 
| style="width: 130px"|Conservative
|William Oliver Fraser
|align="right"|1,784
|align="right"|50.62%
|align="right"|+2.48

|- bgcolor="white"
!align="left" colspan=3|Total
!align="right"|3,524
!align="right"|100.00%
!align="right"|

See also 
Souris – Northwest Territories territorial electoral district (1870–1905).

Electoral district (Canada)
List of Saskatchewan provincial electoral districts
List of Saskatchewan general elections
List of political parties in Saskatchewan

References 
 Saskatchewan Archives Board – Saskatchewan Election Results By Electoral Division

Former provincial electoral districts of Saskatchewan